Uniscribe is the Microsoft Windows set of services for rendering Unicode-encoded text, supporting complex text layout. It is implemented in the dynamic link library .  Uniscribe was released with Windows 2000 and Internet Explorer 5.0.  In addition, the Windows CE platform has supported Uniscribe since version 5.0.

"USP" is an initialism for Unicode Scripts Processor. Its features include:
 arranging input text from the input sequence to visual sequence;
 substituting glyphs according to context (e.g., different forms of Arabic characters);
 ordering displayed text based on text flow direction, such as left-to-right or right-to left, horizontal or vertical.

Although Uniscribe continues to be maintained as of 2021, its intended replacement DirectWrite, which has more features, was introduced with Windows 7.

USP10.DLL Versions
Below are listed some common versions of usp10.dll, as well as the methods by which they are distributed.
	
Features are added according only the "major.minor" part of the version number, the third part in the full version number is used for system target identification numbers for which the DLL was ported by Microsoft, and the last part is the build number on each target system version (which may change within regular system/software updates). Some hotfixes provide upgrades only for specific applications (notably in the Office installation directory), and are not suitable for use in the Windows system directory (whose version of the DLL should never be updated and is often protected by the system):

File sizes may vary depending on specific localizations of the DLL (depending on the target system or application for which it was compiled); those given here are for the US-English localization.

Universal Shaping Engine
Scripts with complex text layout have contextual and non-linear requirements to render their typography correctly. These requirements include: ligatures, where two consecutive characters are combined into one shape (Latin, Devanagari); reordering, where some characters are written before the letter they follow in pronunciation (Bengali, Sinhala, and other Indic scripts); and context-shaping, where some letters have to change shape depending on whether they occur in the beginning, middle, or the end of the word (Arabic, Mongolian).

Uniscribe uses several script-specific shaping engines for handling typography in supported complex scripts; these are implemented in addition to a generic engine for non-complex scripts (such as Latin or Cyrillic). The currently used engines include Indic (Bengali, Devanagari, Gujarati, Gurmukhi, Kannada, etc.), Arabic, Hangul, Hebrew, Khmer, Myanmar, and Thai/Lao variants.

The complexity of the Unicode standard and ambiguities in OpenType specification often result in incomplete or erroneous implementations of complex text layout. Script-specific shaping engines work on a case-by-case basis and do not consistently handle common features of OpenType fonts, which makes it difficult for OS programmers and font developers to support new scripts. Implementation errors are very hard or impossible to correct at a later stage without breaking up backward compatibility for existing documents and fonts, often requiring new OpenType layout features and a redesign of existing fonts and typography rendering engines.

In Windows 10, major refactoring work was done for Uniscribe to implement a generalized shaping model, the Universal Shaping Engine (USE). This engine is directly based on glyph properties defined in the Unicode standard, in the hope that any complex script with a suitable font would be supported  without the time and effort required to create a dedicated shaping engine.

USE builds on a generalized "universal cluster model" developed for the Indic scripts, which models a superset of human writing systems. The engine classifies each character of a complex script into several categories, base classes and subclasses. For example, a provisional Indic classification includes general, syllabic and positional categories, further divided into base (number, consonant, tone letter, dependent vowel, etc.),  base vowel (independent vowel), number (Brahmi joining number), final, medial, and modifier consonants, medial consonants, as well as top, bottom, left and right consonants and vowels. Unicode symbol strings are converted into collections of USE classes using well-defined rules, making glyph composition a standard procedure and allowing inter-character interactions not possible with  current language features defined in OpenType specifications.

The Universal Shaping Engine was presented at the OpenType Developer Meeting in 2014; a compatible approach was also implemented by the open source HarfBuzz text shaper. As of 2020, the USE in Windows 10 handles a total of 70 complex scripts: Adlam, Ahom, Balinese, Batak, Bhaiksuki, Brahmi, Buginese, Buhid, Chakma, Cham, Chorasmian, Dives Akuru, Duployan, Egyptian Hieroglyphs, Elymaic, Grantha, Gunjala Gondi, Hanifi Rohingya, Hanunoo, Javanese, Kaithi, Kayah Li, Kharoshthi, Khitan Small Script, Khojki, Khudawadi, Lepcha, Limbu, Mahajani, Makasar, Mandaic, Manichaean, Marchen, Masaram Gondi, Medefaidrin, Meitei Mayek, Miao, Modi, Mongolian, Multani, Nandinagari, Newa, N’Ko, Nyiakeng Puachue Hmong, Pahawh Hmong, Phags-pa, Psalter Pahlavi, Rejang, Saurashtra, Sharada, Siddham, Sinhala, Sogdian, Old Sogdian, Soyombo, Sundanese, Syloti Nagri, Tagalog, Tagbanwa, Tai Le, Tai Tham (limited support), Tai Viet, Takri, Tibetan, Tifinagh, Tirhuta, Wancho, Yezidi, and Zanabazar Square.

Versions
Although Uniscribe has been available since Windows 2000, new versions of Uniscribe have provided more functions to the system, namely, support for other writing systems.  An earlier update of it supports the display of Arabic and Hebrew, then Thai and Vietnamese.  Since Windows XP, more South Asian and Assyrian scripts are supported.

See also
 International Components for Unicode
 OpenType
 Apple Advanced Typography
 Pango
 Graphite (SIL)
 DirectWrite

References

Notes
 Uniscribe
 Microsoft Typography
 Uniscribe at MSDN
 Summer Institute of Linguistics. Uniscribe versions

External links
 How to update usp10.dll at Windows 2000
 Uniscribe versions
 Introduction to Uniscribe and Good Demo

Unicode
Text rendering libraries